Percy J. Price Jr. (May 19, 1936 – January 12, 1989) was an American amateur boxer. A United States Marine at the time, he competed in the men's heavyweight event at the 1960 Summer Olympics. He had gained his place on the U.S. team by defeating another young boxer then known as Cassius Clay. In his first Olympic bout, Price defeated Ron Taylor of Australia, but he lost to Josef Němec of Czechoslovakia in the quarter finals.

After seven-year hiatus, Marine Staff Sgt. Percy Price, age 33, returned to the ring to win the Armed Forces Boxing Championships at the Philadelphia Sports Arena. In front of a capacity crowd including world heavyweight champion Joe Frazier, Price, 222, won a three-round decision over 20-years Duane Bobick, 199. After the bout, Price, father of six, announced he would never fight again.

Price turned down offers of a professional career and remained in the Marine Corps until he retired in 1976. However, he won numerous military boxing titles, and also completed two full combat tours of duty in South Vietnam as a Marine platoon leader.

References

1936 births
1989 deaths
American male boxers
Olympic boxers of the United States
Boxers at the 1960 Summer Olympics
People from Salem, New Jersey
Sportspeople from Salem County, New Jersey
Boxers from New Jersey
Heavyweight boxers